Bulbophyllum chimaera is a species of orchid in the genus Bulbophyllum.

It was identified by Schltr. in 1913. The species grows within montane forests at an approximate elevation  on tree trunks devoid of moss, in Papua and New Guinea.

The genus Bulbophyllum contains around 2000 species distributed across the warmer continents. It was first described by Louis-Marie Aubert du Petit-Thouars

References

External links
 The Bulbophyllum-Checklist
 The Internet Orchid Species Photo Encyclopedia

chimaera